The Diocese of Lansing is a Latin Church ecclesiastical territory, or diocese, of the Catholic Church located in the south-central portion of Michigan in the United States. The Diocese of Lansing is a suffragan diocese in the ecclesiastical province of metropolitan Archdiocese of Detroit.

Territory 
The Diocese of Lansing encompasses an area of  including the counties of Clinton, Eaton, Genesee, Hillsdale, Ingham, Jackson, Lenawee, Livingston, Shiawassee and Washtenaw.

History

1700 to 1937 
During the 17th century, present-day Michigan was part of the French colony of New France. The Diocese of Quebec had jurisdiction over the region. In 1763, the Michigan area became part of the British Province of Quebec, forbidden from settlement by American colonists. After the American Revolution, the Michigan region became part of the new United States.  For Catholics, Michigan was now under the jurisdiction of the Archdiocese of Baltimore, which then comprised the entire country.

In 1808, Pope Pius VII erected the Diocese of Bardstown in Kentucky, with jurisdiction over the new Michigan Territory. In 1821, the pope erected the Diocese of Cincinnati, taking the Michigan Territory from the Diocese of Bardstown.Pope Gregory XVI formed the Diocese of Detroit in 1833, covering the entire Michigan Territory. The Lansing area would be part of the Diocese of Detroit, followed by the Archdiocese of Detroit, for the next 104 years.

1937 to present 
Pope Pius XI created the Diocese of Lansing May 22, 1937, removing its territory from the Archdiocese of Detroit. He named Auxiliary Bishop Joseph H. Albers of the Archdiocese of Cincinnati as the first bishop of Lansing that same year.

In January 1938, the rectory of St. Mary Cathedral caught fire. Albers, still suffering from lungs weakened from poison gas in World War I, collapsed at the scene and had to be rescued by firefighters. In 1940, Albers moved into Meadowvue in Eaton Rapids, Michigan, his episcopal residence. 

During Albers's episcopacy, the diocese built 38 parishes, 42 elementary schools and two high schools.  This earned Albers the appellation "The Builder". Albers enjoyed a special devotion to St. Joseph; one of the new parishes was named for him.  On August 1, 1954, the diocesan newsletter Catholic Weekly, Lansing began publication.  Albers was instrumental in its startup. Albers retired in 1964.

In July 1971, Pope Paul VI separated territory from the Lansing Diocese and territory from the Diocese of Grand Rapids to form the new Diocese of Kalamazoo. On August 13, 2017 Bishop Boyea consecrated the diocese to the Immaculate Heart of Mary. 

In January 2021, the diocese instituted a new policy for schools, parishes, and charities regarding the biological sex of students, parishioners and others. This policy included direction on the use of pronouns and requirements that bathrooms and sports be segregated according to biological sex.  The policy also required school officials to avoid participating in the administration of hormonal treatment of students that was designed to alter their sexual characteristics. 

The diocese claimed that the new policy affirmed the reality and discomfort of gender dysphoria.  The diocese recommended that transgender individuals visit counselors who "hold a correct Christian anthropology of the human person and understand and adhere to Catholic teaching."

Sex abuse cases
On May 24, 2019, the State of Michigan announced that five priests who previously served in the Diocese of Lansing were being charged with sexual abuse crimes.  Attorney General Dana Nessel stated that four suspects had been arrested in the United States and the fifth was awaiting extradition from India. Nessel said that one  suspect, Vincent DeLorenzo, was accused by eight victims. He was charged with six counts of both first and second degree sexual misconduct.  The Vatican was in the process of defrocking DeLorenzo. A sixth priest had his counseling license suspended by the state.

As of September 27, 2019, the Diocese of Lansing had  not released the list of all priests with credible accusations against them.

On September 14, 2020, Joseph Comperchio, a former teacher employed by the diocese at St. John Catholic School in Jackson, Michigan, was arrested in Fort Myers, Florida. He was charged with two counts of first-degree criminal sexual conduct and four counts of second-degree criminal sexual conduct.  Comperchio reportedly committed these acts at the school between 1974 and 1977.  Following his arrest, Comperchio was denied bond.

Churches

Bishops

Bishops of Lansing
 Joseph H. Albers (1937–65) 
 Alexander M. Zaleski (1965–75)
 Kenneth Joseph Povish (1975–95)
 Carl Frederick Mengeling (1995–2008)
 Earl Boyea (2008–present)

Auxiliary Bishops
Michael Joseph Green (1962–67), appointed Bishop of Reno
James Stephen Sullivan (1972–85), appointed Bishop of Fargo

Other diocesan priests who became bishops
Paul Vincent Donovan, appointed Bishop of Kalamazoo in 1971
James Albert Murray, appointed Bishop of Kalamazoo in 1997
Steven John Raica, appointed Bishop of Gaylord from 2014-2020, appointed Bishop of Birmingham in 2020
Gerald Lee Vincke, appointed Bishop of Salina in 2018

High schools
 Father Gabriel Richard High School, Ann Arbor
 Lansing Catholic High School, Lansing
 Lumen Christi Catholic High School, Jackson
 Powers Catholic High School, Flint
 St. Thomas More Academy*, Burton

 * Operates independently and with the blessing of the Diocese.

Media
The Diocese owns the publisher FAITH Catholic, which publishes Catholic magazines for dioceses and organizations. FAITH Catholic also operates the website MassTimes.org.

See also

 Catholic Church by country
 Catholic Church hierarchy
 List of the Catholic dioceses of the United States

References

External links
 Roman Catholic Diocese Of Lansing Official Site
 FAITH Magazine - diocesan magazine

 
Lansing
Lansing
Christian organizations established in 1937
Lansing
1937 establishments in Michigan